Marilyn D.A. Manibusan is a Guamanian politician. Manibusan is a former Republican senator in the Guam Legislature. Manibusan is the first chairwoman of the Republican Party of Guam.

Early life 
Manibusan's father was Joaquin V.E. Manibusan, Sr., (1921-1999) a traffic 
and small claims court judge in Guam. Manibusan's mother was Alejandrina Atoigue Manibusan (died 1998). Manibusan is the eldest with three siblings, including Joaquin V.E. Manibusan, Jr.

Career 
On November 2, 1982, Manibusan won the election and became a Republican senator in the Guam Legislature. Manibusan served her first term on January 3, 1983 in the 17th Guam Legislature. Manibusan served her second term on January 7, 1985 in the 18th Guam Legislature.

In 1986, Manibusan became the first chairwoman of the Republican Party of Guam.

Manibusan served her third term on January 5, 1987 in the 19th Guam Legislature. Manibusan served her fourth term on January 2, 1989 in the 20th Guam Legislature. Manibusan served her fifth term on January 7, 1991 in the 21st Guam Legislature. Manibusan served her sixth term on January 4, 1993 in the 22nd Guam Legislature, which ended on January 2, 1995.

Manibusan was chairwoman of the Guam Territorial Land Use Commission, which regulated land development.

In March 2003, Manibusan was found guilty of 22 charges, including extortion and bankruptcy fraud. In August 2003, Manibusan was sentenced by the federal court to 71-months in prison for accepting kickbacks from developers in exchange for approvals and funding. In September 2003, Manibusan began her prison sentence at Federal Correctional Institution in Dublin, California.

References

External links 
 Women In Public Service at congress.gov

Guamanian politicians convicted of crimes
Guamanian Republicans
Guamanian women in politics
Living people
Members of the Legislature of Guam
Year of birth missing (living people)
21st-century American women